The men's hammer throw at the 2010 African Championships in Athletics was held on July 31.

Results

External links
Results

Hammer
Hammer throw at the African Championships in Athletics